A Parisian in Rome (Italian: Una parigina a Roma, German: Begegnung in Rom) is a 1954 Italian-German comedy film directed by Erich Kobler and starring Barbara Laage, Alberto Sordi and Anna Maria Ferrero.

The film's sets were designed by the art director Ottavio Scotti.

Cast
 Barbara Laage as Germaine, la Parigina 
 Alberto Sordi as Alberto Lucetti 
 Anna Maria Ferrero as Fiorella 
 Erwin Strahl as Riccardo / Richard Koster 
 Paul Hörbiger as Professor Roth 
 Marcello Giorda as Sandi, padre di Fiorella 
 Mino Doro as Maestro Manardi 
 Uta Franz as Cicci, un'amica di Fiorella 
 John Stacy as Maestro Brovin 
 Edmondo Corsi as Franco, amico di Fiorella 
 Giulio Bars as Sculptore Petroff 
 Marisa Castellani as Silvana 
 Ileana Lauro as Germaine's Maid 
 Gina Mascetti as Fiorella's Maid 
 Rio Nobile as Orti di Tiberio 
 Franco Jamonte as Un amico di Fiorella 
 Gabriella Scodino as Altra amica di Fiorella

References

Bibliography 
 Claudio G. Fava. Alberto Sordi. Gremese Editore, 2003.

External links 
 

1954 films
Italian comedy films
West German films
German comedy films
1954 comedy films
1950s Italian-language films
Films directed by Erich Kobler
Films set in Rome
Italian black-and-white films
German black-and-white films
1950s Italian films
1950s German films